Vivian Austin (born Irene Vivian Coe, February 23, 1920 – August 1, 2004) was an American actress who appeared in a number of films in the late 1930s and early 1940s, although most were B movies.

Early years
Austin was born Irene Vivian Coe in Hollywood, California, and attended Hollywood High School. She was named Miss Hollywood in 1939.

Career
Austin played a variety of bit parts (as well as extra and stunt work) in movies before being cast as the female romantic lead in The Adventures of Red Ryder (1940). She was signed to a stock contract in 1943 by Universal and as Vivian Austin (for Universal) or Terry Austin (under contract to Eagle-Lion Films) appeared in movies such as Destiny (1944), Trigger Trail (1944), Born To Speed (1947) and Philo Vance Returns (1947). Her career was cut short in the late 1940s by kidney failure and resultant blindness.

Later years
After her retirement, Austin helped Jane Russell to found the World Adoption International Fund (WAIF) and herself founded the Braille Auxiliary of the Desert, an organisation to support the charitable activities of the Braille Institute. In 1996 she lived in Palm Springs, California.

Personal life
Austin married millionaire auto dealer Glenn Austin (d. 1967) when she was 17. She later wed ophthalmic surgeon Kenneth A. Grow (d. 1993), who had operated on her and helped to improve her sight.

Death
On August 1, 2004, Austin died from natural causes in a hospital in Los Angeles, California. Because Grow had served in the United States Army, she and he are interred at Riverside National Cemetery in Riverside, California.

Filmography

References

External links
 

1920 births
2004 deaths
20th-century American actresses
American film actresses
Actresses from Palm Springs, California
Burials at Riverside National Cemetery
21st-century American women